Adina Linnea Birgitta Regnander (born 1 April 1993) is a Swedish runway model. Regnander studied at Kunskapsgymnasiet in Västerås, she lives in the town but has also in periods been living in Melbourne, Australia with her family.

Regnander started working as a model with Stockholmsgruppen at the age of sixteen. She got her breakthrough in July 2010 when she did runway work for designer Valentino in Paris. Since then she has done runway work for designers like Calvin Klein, Gucci, Alexis Mabille, Miu Miu, Alexander Wang, Salvatore Ferragamo and Elie Saab.

Regnander has also done commercial jobs for the brands Uggs, H&M, Other Stories, Max Mara, Boomerang and GAP.

References

Swedish female models
Living people
1993 births